"Lookin' for a Love" is a song written by J. W. Alexander and Zelda Samuels and was the debut hit of the family group the Valentinos, which featured Bobby Womack. The song was a hit for the Valentinos, climbing to number eight on the R&B chart and crossing over to number 72 on the Billboard Hot 100 in 1962, released on Sam Cooke's SAR label.  The song became a much bigger hit when Womack issued a solo version in 1974; this version reached number one on the R&B chart and number ten on the Billboard Hot 100.  As well, an interim version of "Lookin' for a Love" by the J. Geils Band in 1971 was a top-40 hit for them, peaking at number 39.

Background
The melody originally came from a gospel hymn titled, "Couldn't Hear Nobody Pray," recorded and released in 1961 when they were still known as the Womack Brothers. Sam Cooke produced that session as well as the sessions for "Lookin' For a Love". Following the release of "Couldn't Hear Nobody Pray" and convinced that 17-year-old Bobby Womack would "go places", Cooke hired his staff writers J. W. Alexander and Zelda Samuels to rewrite the song as a doo-wop dance number, basing the song's chord structure on the melodic motif found in "Pray".

When the brothers were presented with the song, they protested initially fearing a backlash from their minister father, Friendly Womack. However, Cooke convinced them that the song would be a hit and guarantee the Womacks some financial success as well as commercial. Like "Couldn't Hear Nobody Pray", the song featured Bobby on lead. Prior to its release, Cooke suggested a name change, thinking the change would do wonders for their career as it had done for him. Cooke settled on the Valentinos and released the song that spring.

Chart performance
After its success, the group opened for James Brown & The Famous Flames where they won fans. In 1973, Bobby used "Lookin' for a Love" as a warm-up song to help loosen up his vocal cords during a recording session. Womack recorded one take of the song - with his brothers again providing background vocals - but had no plans of putting it out as a single. However, after some convincing, he released the song in early 1974 and the song went on to be his most successful single to date, and was his second number-one single on the Hot Soul Singles chart (after "Woman's Gotta Have It" in 1972, which only got to number 60 on the Hot 100) and his first and only top-10 hit on the Billboard Hot 100, where it peaked at number 10. It also reached number eight on the Cash Box Top 100. The single was later certified gold by the RIAA for sales of one million copies. This resulted in the song later selling more than two million copies. The song's success was bittersweet, however: the song's background vocalist Harry Womack later died from stab wounds from his girlfriend the week before it hit number one.

Charts
Valentinos original

Credits (Bobby Womack versions)

1962 original
Lead vocal by Bobby Womack
Background vocals by the Valentinos: Friendly Womack, Jr., Curtis Womack, Harry Womack and Cecil Womack
Instrumentation by SAR Records staff musicians, Bobby Womack (guitar) and Harry Womack (bass)
Produced by Sam Cooke

1974 version
Lead vocal by Bobby Womack
Background vocals by the Valentinos: Friendly Womack, Jr., Curtis Womack, Harry Womack and Cecil Womack
Instrumentation by the Muscle Shoals Rhythm Section
Produced by Bobby Womack

Charts
Bobby Womack version

Weekly charts

Year-end charts

J. Geils Band cover

Cover Versions
In 1971, rock band the J. Geils Band covered the song as one of its first releases and the song became a top-40 hit for them, peaking at number 39. 
Squeeze covered the song for their album East Side Story, which features Paul Carrack on co-lead vocals. The track is only available as a bonus track.
Tortoise Matsumoto as singer of Ulfuls had covered the song his first solo album Traveller in 2003.

See also
Looking for Love (disambiguation)

References

"Lookin' for a Love" song review [] on Allmusic website

1962 singles
1971 singles
1974 singles
Bobby Womack songs
The J. Geils Band songs
Songs written by J. W. Alexander (musician)
1962 songs
Atlantic Records singles
United Artists Records singles
Song recordings produced by Bobby Womack